Lee Chae-young (born April 29, 1986) is a South Korean actress. She debuted in a music video called "Come On" by the Hip-hop group Turtles in 2003. The following year, she appeared in Rain's "I Do" music video and in 2007, Yoon Mi-rae's "Did You Forget It". Her first television drama was Witch Yoo Hee, a romantic comedy, as Chef Marie. It wasn't until she was cast as Sa Illa in the 2009 historical drama Iron Empress and took the role as a host on the Korean Broadcasting System (KBS) variety show Star Golden Bell that her popularity rose. She is a Dankook University graduate and the younger sister of Seo Seung-ah.

Personal life

Lee attended Mirim Girls' High School during her youth, and later attended Dankook University. Her hobbies include swimming and judo.

She is sometimes referred to as "Little Jang"; the nickname originated because of her resemblance to actress Jang Jin-young.

Life and career

2003–07: Debut and Witch Yoo Hee
She made her debut in the hip-hop group Turtles' "Come On" music video from the album Turtles 2 in 2003. In 2004, she appeared in Rain's "I Do" music video as his girl and is seen waiting for him in a restaurant at the end of the video. Appearing in two more music video, Air Rise's "Away" and Yoon Mi Rae's "Did You Forget It", she made her first television drama in 2007. Her first television drama was Witch Yoo Hee as Chef Marie and later that year; she appeared in Find My Son, Sam Man Ri.

2008–10: Life is Cool and Iron Empress
In 2008, she landed her first movie role in Life is Cool which also happen to be the first rotoscoped movie in South Korea. She was cast as Han Saet Byeol in her second movie, Truck, starring Yoo Hae Jin. Her popular began to rise even more when she was cast as Sa Illa in the 2009 historical drama, Iron Empress. Her character joins the leading character, Empress Cheonchu, and played a supportive role throughout the story. She and Jeon Hyeon-moo took over as host of Star Golden Bell when the show was going through changes. In 2008, she made an appearance in the Homme music video, "I Was Able to Eat Well", as a girl who causes Lee Hyun and Changmin to fight over her. She accepted modeling deals with DL1961, Apple Hip and Men's Health.

2011–present: Royal Family, "Man Should Laugh" and Miracle
In 2011, she was cast in the drama Royal Family as Park Min Kyeong and modeled for 11th Street for 4th modeling shoot. She was chosen with Park Han Byul, Lee Tae Im, Jang Ji Eun and Jun Eun Mi in a promotion group called the Ocean Girls for the water park Ocean World. In July, she appeared Homme's second music video "Man Should Laugh" and it shows the love triangle turning into a serious fight. Her latest movie is Bicycle Looking for a Whale (or Miracle) as Yeong Chae, it was released on September 22.

In August 2018, Lee signed with new management agency SidusHQ.

Filmography

TV series
 2007: Witch Yoo Hee – Chef Marie
 2007: Find My Son, Sam Man Ri – Song Hee-joo
 2009: Iron Empress – Sa Il-la
 2009: Soul Special – Min Se-hee
 2009: Wife Returns – Min Yi Hyun
 2010: Comrades – Dan-yeong
 2011: Royal Family – Park Min-kyeong
 2012: The Birth of a Family – Ma Ye-ri
 2014: Two Mothers – Lee Hwa-young
 2015: More Than a Maid – Ga Hee-ah
 2017: The Emperor: Owner of the Mask – Mae Chang
 2018: A Poem a Day – Kim Yoon-joo
 2018: My Strange Hero – a bride (cameo, ep. 1)
 2019: Home for Summer – Joo Sang-mi
 2020–2021: Man in a Veil – Han Yoo-ra
 2023 : Woman in a Veil – Joo Ae-ra

Variety shows
 2009: Star Golden Bell – Host
 2010: A Guy Who Reads Baseball
 2010: Wonder Woman
 2011: Show Show Show
 2019: King Of Mask Singer
 2021: Korea's Chicken Battle – judge
 2021:  Cooking - The Birth of a Cooking King – Contestant
 2022–present: Goal Girl – Cast Member (Season 3)

Films
 2008: Life is Cool – Kim Mi-young
 2008: Truck – Han Saet-byeol
 2009: Flight – Soo-ah
 2011: Bicycle Looking for a Whale/Miracle – Yeong-chae
 2012: The Grand Heist – Seol-hwa
 2013: Secretly, Greatly – Ran
 2013: The Devil Rider – Seoyeon
 2015: The Mirror
 2020: The cursed lesson - Hyo Jung
 2021: Tomb of the River 
 2021 : Lady Gambler – Mimi 
 2022: The Killer: A Girl Who Deserves to Die

Music videos
 2003: Turtles – Come On
 2004: Rain – I Do
 2004: Air Rise – Away
 2007: Yoon Mi-rae – Did You Forget It
 2008: Natural – 보내는 마음
 2009:Lee Soo Young – I Erase It
 2009: Hwayobi – Once
 2009: K.Will – 사랑한단 말을 못해서
 2010: Rumble Fish – 남잔 다 그래
 2010: Kim Dong Hee – 죽을것같아
 2010: Homme – I Was Able to Eat Well
 2011: Ocean Girls – Ride Now
 2011: Homme – Man Should Laugh

TV commercials / endorsements
 Lotte Confectionery
 SK Telecom
 CJ
 Lihom

Modeling
 11th Street
 Men's Health
 Apple Hip
 DL1961 Premium Jeans
 Maxim

Awards and nominations

References

External links
 
 
 

Living people
1986 births
People from Seoul
Dankook University alumni
South Korean television personalities
South Korean television actresses
South Korean film actresses
IHQ (company) artists